Everything, every-thing, or every thing, is all that exists; the opposite of nothing, or its complement. It is the totality of things relevant to some subject matter. Without expressed or implied limits, it may refer to anything. The universe is everything that exists theoretically, though a multiverse may exist according to theoretical cosmology predictions. It may refer to an anthropocentric worldview, or the sum of human experience, history, and the human condition in general. Every object and entity is a part of everything, including all physical bodies and in some cases all abstract objects.

Scope
In ordinary conversation, everything usually refers only to the totality of things relevant to the subject matter. When there is no expressed limitation, everything may refer to the universe, or the world.

The universe is most commonly defined as everything that physically exists: the entirety of time, all forms of matter, energy and momentum, and the physical laws and constants that govern them. However, the term "universe" may be used in slightly different contextual senses, denoting such concepts as the cosmos, the world, or nature. According to some speculations, this universe may be one of many disconnected universes, which are collectively denoted as the multiverse. In the bubble universe theory, there is an infinite variety of universes, each with different physical constants. In the many-worlds hypothesis, new universes are spawned with every quantum measurement. By definition, these speculations cannot currently be tested experimentally, yet, if multiple universes do exist, they would still be part of everything.

Especially in a metaphysical context, World may refer to everything that constitutes reality and the universe: see World (philosophy). However, world may only refer to Earth envisioned from an anthropocentric or human worldview, as a place by human beings.

In theoretical physics

In theoretical physics, a theory of everything (TOE) is a hypothetical theory that fully explains and links together all known physical phenomena. Initially, the term was used with an ironic connotation to refer to various overgeneralized theories. For example, a great-grandfather of Ijon Tichy—a character from a cycle of Stanisław Lem's science fiction stories of the 1960s—was known to work on the "General Theory of Everything". Over time, the term stuck in popularizations of quantum physics to describe a theory that would unify or explain through a single model the theories of all fundamental interactions of nature.

There have been many theories of everything proposed by theoretical physicists over the last century, but none have been confirmed experimentally. The primary problem in producing a TOE is that the accepted theories of quantum mechanics, general relativity, or special relativity are hard to combine. Theories exploring quantum mechanics and string theory are easier to combine.

Based on theoretical holographic principle arguments from the 1990s, many physicists believe that 11-dimensional M-theory, which is described in many sectors by matrix string theory, and in many other sectors by perturbative string theory, is the complete theory of everything. Other physicists disagree.

In philosophy

In philosophy, a theory of everything or TOE is an ultimate, all-encompassing explanation of nature or reality. Adopting the term from physics, where the search for a theory of everything is ongoing, philosophers have discussed the viability of the concept and analyzed its properties and implications. Among the questions to be addressed by a philosophical theory of everything are: "Why is reality understandable?", "Why are the laws of nature as they are?", and "Why is there anything at all?".

See also
Alpha and Omega
Trivialism, the logical theory that every statement (or everything) is true.
Something (concept)
Nothing
Infinity

References

Perception
Ontology
Quantity